Eyal Meshumar (born August 10, 1983) is a retired Israeli footballer.

Club career

Hapoel Kfar Saba
Eyal Meshumar growing youth group of Hapoel Kfar Saba, in 2000 came the first team.

Maccabi Haifa
In 2006, after the passage of Klemi Saban from Maccabi Haifa Romanian team Steaua Bucharest, Maccabi Haifa has decided to sign a 5-year canned in a transaction which has passed Guillermo Israilevich Hapoel Kfar Saba. He subsequently became a permanent player canned composition of Maccabi Haifa and won two titles. In 2009/2010 season with the team climbed Group stage of the Champions League. On July 27, 2011 served as team captain canned game against Maribor Slovenian framework Champions League qualification again wear the captain on other occasions as captain changer.

International career
On 13 October 2007, he began his debut Israeli national team, match against Croatia as part of the Euro 2008 qualifiers.

Honours

Club
Hapoel Kfar Saba
Liga Leumit
Winner (1):2004-05

Maccabi Haifa
Toto Cup
Winner (1):2007-08
Israeli Championships
Winner (2): 2008–09, 2010–11
Runner-up (2): 2009–10, 2012–13
Israel State Cup
Winner (1): 2016
Runner-up (3): 2009, 2011, 2012

References

External links
 

1983 births
Living people
Israeli Jews
Israeli footballers
Hapoel Kfar Saba F.C. players
Maccabi Haifa F.C. players
Hapoel Tel Aviv F.C. players
Hapoel Ashkelon F.C. players
Israel international footballers
Liga Leumit players
Israeli Premier League players
Israeli people of Yemeni-Jewish descent
Footballers from Kfar Saba
Association football defenders